The Coaching Club American Oaks is a race for thoroughbred three-year-old fillies and the second leg of the Triple Tiara of Thoroughbred Racing. Originally run at Belmont Park, the Grade I $500,000 stakes race was moved to Saratoga Race Course in 2010.

Run as a handicap prior to 1928, the race is named in honor of the Coaching Club of New York.  One of the requirements for membership in this club was the ability to handle a coach and four horses with a single group of reins. August Belmont Jr. set the original conditions in order to emulate The Oaks in England.

From 1963 to 1967 the Coaching Club American Oaks was run at Aqueduct Racetrack. Over the years, it has been raced at various distances:
1917, 2010–present : 9 furlongs
1990–1997, 2003–2009 : 10 furlongs
1919–1941, 1944–1958 : 11 furlongs
1942–1943, 1971–1989, 1998–2003 : 12 furlongs

Historical notes

Future U.S. Racing Hall of Fame inductee Mom's Command won the 1985 Oaks under jockey  Abigail Fuller, daughter of the horse's owner, Peter Fuller.

Records
Speed record: 
(at distance of 12f)
 2:27.80 – Ruffian (1975); Magazine (1973) 
(at distance of 10f)
 2:00.40 – Ajina (1997)
(at distance of 9f)
 1:49.15 – It's Tricky (2011)
Most wins by a jockey:
 5 – Mike E. Smith (1993, 1997, 2000, 2016, 2017)
 5 – John R. Velazquez (2001, 2004, 2007, 2010, 2015)
 4 – Jorge Velásquez (1974, 1977, 1979, 1988)
 4 – Jerry D. Bailey (1996, 1998, 1999, 2003)

Most wins by a trainer:
 8 – Todd Pletcher (2001, 2004, 2007, 2010, 2013, 2014, 2015, 2022)

Most wins by an owner:
 6 – Calumet Farm (1944, 1949, 1952, 1958, 1977, 1979)

Winners

See also
 Acorn Stakes

References
 June 17, 1917 New York Times article on the inaugural running of the Coaching Club Handicap
 The 2009 Coaching Club American Oaks at the NTRA

Graded stakes races in the United States
Flat horse races for three-year-old fillies
Grade 1 stakes races in the United States
Horse races in New York (state)
Belmont Park
Recurring sporting events established in 1917
Triple Tiara of Thoroughbred Racing
1917 establishments in New York (state)